Isla Paraíso is a Chilean comedy telenovela created by Alejandro Cabrera, that premiered on Mega on October 2, 2018 and ended on September 4, 2019. It stars Paola Volpato, Francisco Melo and Andrés Velasco. Filming of the telenovela began in July 2018 and concluded on 9 August 2019.

The telenovela takes place in Isla Paraíso, a beautiful and picturesque place, located at the end of the world, it is strangely a town where only men live, until one day a bus full of only women arrives, which will change the whole town.

Plot 
Carolina is a housewife who is involved in a millionaire scam due to the irresponsible handling of her husband. Persecuted by the police, she flees with her son Andy and her Dominican employee Madelyn, seeking refuge in the convent where her twin sister Celeste lives. However, Celeste cannot help her, since she is leaving for a sacrificed mission in a remote town in southern Chile: Isla Paraíso. The town is located at the end of the world and is only inhabited by men. This condition leads Father Gabriel to make an announcement that has everyone shaken up: a bus full of women will soon arrive, who will come to work, granting them facilities to establish themselves. Thus, the priest thinks, they will return life back into the town that is destined to disappear.

While Father Gabriel is determined to see the town full of women, on the other side is his great critic: Óscar León, a powerful landowner who gives work to most of the men of Isla Paraíso. Óscar has personal reasons for not wanting woman in town. But once they arrive in the area, there is no turning back. Woman arriving to the town include a nun, a Caribbean employee, and a young woman left at the altar. What no one suspects is that Celeste is an impostor, because in reality she is Carolina, the woman persecuted by police, who has managed to escape by taking refuge in Isla Paraíso and posing as her sister. Óscar will become her new enemy because without a doubt, he would be willing to hand her over to the police if he discovered her true identity. Although without realizing it, Óscar also discovers that Carolina is the first woman he has trusted again after many years.

Cast 
 Paola Volpato as Carolina Miranda / Celeste Miranda
 Francisco Melo as Óscar León
 Andrés Velasco as Padre Gabriel Riveros
 Nicolás Oyarzún as Franco León
 Montserrat Ballarin as Sofía Stolzenbach
 Fernando Godoy as Juan Luis Farías
 Dayana Amigo as Angelina Yolanda Salazar
 César Caillet as Hernán Sepúlveda
 María José Prieto as Elena Martínez
 Paulo Brunetti as Diego Bandini
 Magdalena Müller as Rosalía Gallegos
 Etienne Bobenrieth as Pablo Arriagada
 Carmen Disa Gutiérrez as Gloria Domínguez
 Fernando Farías as Leonel Toro
 Paulina Hunt as Doris Castillo
 Mabel Farías as Gustava Rioseco
 Francisco Ossa as Carlos Rojas
 Felipe Rojas as Luka Mancini
 Constanza Mackenna as Juliette Blanche
 Annis Carrión as Madelyn Santana
 Elías Collado as Andrés Rojas
 Simón Beltrán as Moísés León
 Giulia Inostroza as Beatriz Bandini
 Roxana Naranjo as Violeta
 Rosmarie Gallo as Flor
 Daniel de la Vega as Fuenzalida
 Andrés Olea as Cárcamo
 Patricio Cifuentes as Detective Peralta

Ratings

References

External links 
 

2018 Chilean television series debuts
2019 Chilean television series endings
2018 telenovelas
Chilean telenovelas
Mega (Chilean TV channel) telenovelas
Spanish-language telenovelas